This Is Fire is the third album by Spires That in the Sunset Rise, released in 2006.

Track listing
"Spike Fiddle Song" – 5:53
"Clouds" – 6:26
"Sleeplike" – 3:30
"Morning Song" – 7:14
"Sea Shanty" – 6:13
"Let the Crows Fly" – 5:13
"Bee Forms" – 7:34
"Desert Mind" – 6:03

2006 albums